Dent de Cons is a mountain of Savoie and Haute-Savoie, France.

References

Mountains of Savoie
Mountains of Haute-Savoie
Mountains of the Alps
Two-thousanders of France